Sangarange Don Anurasiri (born 25 February 1966, Panadura) is a former Sri Lankan cricketer who played in 18 Tests and 45 ODIs from 1986 to 1998. He was a left-arm orthodox spinner who spent his career in and out of the national side. Post-retirement, he spent many years as a member of Sri Lanka's national cricket selection committee.

International career
He made his Test debut aged just 20 in a match against Pakistan at Colombo on 14 March 1986. He only bowled four overs in the Test as Sri Lanka caused an upset with an eight-wicket victory. He never took a five wicket haul in his 18 Tests but was often successful for Sri Lanka in containing batsman especially on unresponsive wickets. His best series came against the touring Australians in 1992-93 when he took 10 wickets.

After some conflict with the Sri Lankan Cricket Board in 1994 it seemed that his international career was over but he made a comeback in 1997–98 against Zimbabwe. He partnered Muttiah Muralitharan and took 3 for 65 and 1 for 41 in a winning cause. Three first class games later he ended his cricket career.

References

External links
 

Sri Lankan cricketers
1966 births
Living people
Sri Lanka Test cricketers
Sri Lanka One Day International cricketers
Cricketers at the 1987 Cricket World Cup
Cricketers at the 1992 Cricket World Cup
Basnahira South cricketers
Panadura Sports Club cricketers
People from Panadura